David Edward Lindstrom (born 29 September 1948) is a New Zealand rower.

Early life
Lindstrom was born in 1948 in Christchurch, New Zealand. He received his education at St Bede's College (1962–1966) and then studied obtained a Bachelor of Commerce from the University of Canterbury (1967–1969). Ross Lindstrom is his cousin.

Rowing
Lindstrom is a member of Avon Rowing Club. He represented New Zealand at the 1972 Summer Olympics in the coxed four, coming sixth in the event. He is listed as New Zealand Olympian athlete number 287 by the New Zealand Olympic Committee. He represented New Zealand at the 1976 Summer Olympics in the Coxless four in a team with Bob Murphy, Grant McAuley, and Des Lock, narrowly beaten by the team from the Soviet Union to fourth place. The 1977 World Rowing Championships saw Lindstrom win silver in the coxless four with Des Lock, Ivan Sutherland and Dave Rodger under new coach Harry Mahon. His last international success came in the 1978 World Rowing Championships at Lake Karapiro, when he won bronze with the New Zealand eight.

In 2006, Lindstrom was appointed to the panel of junior national selectors by Rowing New Zealand (RNZ), and he later became the convenor of this panel. He was a rowing coach at his old school, St Bede's College, for many years. Travelling to the 2015 Maadi Cup, two of his rowers were involved in a security breach at Auckland Airport. St Bede's headmaster stood the rowers down from the regatta and Lindstrom had a public fallout with the headmaster over the affair. It resulted in his resignation as rowing coach at St Bede's, but he was also dumped by RNZ as a junior selector. Lindstrom was coaching the Wanganui Collegiate School rowing club, and provided results to the school within his first year of coaching. Lindstrom is now head coach of the Christchurch Girls' High School rowing club.

References

1948 births
Living people
Rowers from Christchurch
People educated at St Bede's College, Christchurch
New Zealand male rowers
Rowers at the 1972 Summer Olympics
Rowers at the 1976 Summer Olympics
Olympic rowers of New Zealand
World Rowing Championships medalists for New Zealand